The New Sharon Bridge was a single-span iron Pennsylvania truss that carried U.S. Route 2 (US 2) over the Sandy River in New Sharon, Maine. The bridge was built in 1916, closed to traffic in the 1990s, and was demolished on February 27, 2014. It had been listed on the National Register of Historic Places as one of only three pin-connected Pennsylvania truss bridges in the state.

Description and history
The bridge was oriented roughly northwest to southeast, crossing the Sandy River adjacent to the center of New Sharon. It was a single-span, pin-connected, Pennsylvania truss, one of only three such bridges built in the state. The bridge was manufactured by the Groton Bridge Co. and erected in 1916 on concrete abutments with ashlar granite wingwalls. It had a steel grid deck giving a roadway  in width.

When the current alignment of US 2 was built in 1959, a modern span was built downstream to carry it, and the road this bridge carried was designated Main Street. The bridge was closed by the state in the 1990s because of its deteriorating condition. Further cracking in the abutments over time led to the decision in 2013 to demolish it. The bridge was brought down on February 27, 2014. Explosive charges meant to accomplish the feat failed to do so, apparently because the aging concrete of the abutments absorbed the force of the blast. Large jackhammers were brought in to finish the job.

See also

National Register of Historic Places listings in Franklin County, Maine
List of bridges on the National Register of Historic Places in Maine

References

Bridges completed in 1916
Transportation buildings and structures in Franklin County, Maine
Demolished bridges in the United States
U.S. Route 2
Road bridges in Maine
Iron bridges in the United States
Pennsylvania truss bridges in the United States
Former National Register of Historic Places in Maine